Dwight Wallace (born December 26, 1943) is a former American football player, coach, and college athletics administrator.  He served as the head football coach at the Ball State University from 1978 to 1984, compiling a record of 40–37.

Head coaching record

References

1943 births
Living people
American football quarterbacks
American men's basketball players
Ball State Cardinals athletic directors
Ball State Cardinals football coaches
Bowling Green Falcons football coaches
Bowling Green Falcons football players
Bowling Green Falcons men's basketball players
Central Michigan Chippewas football coaches
Colorado Buffaloes football coaches
Iowa Wesleyan Tigers baseball coaches
Iowa Wesleyan Tigers football coaches
West Virginia Mountaineers football coaches
People from Wilmington, Ohio
Players of American football from Ohio